Ana Bogdan was the defending champion but chose not to participate.

Sorana Cîrstea won the title, defeating Kateřina Siniaková in the final, 4–6, 6–3, 6–3.

Seeds

Draw

Finals

Top half

Bottom half

References

Main Draw

Al Habtoor Tennis Challenge - Singles
2020 Singles
2020 in Emirati tennis